Berson is a surname, a patronymic from the Yiddish name Ber. Notable people with the surname include:

Arthur Berson (1859–1942), German meteorologist
Jerome A. Berson (1924–2017), American chemist
Mark Berson (born 1953), American soccer coach
Mathieu Berson (born 1980), French footballer
Norman Berson (1926–2019), American politician
Seweryn Berson (1858–1917), Polish lawyer and composer
Solomon Berson (1918–1972), American physician and scientist

See also
Berson, Gironde, commune in the Gironde department in France

References